Ghansor is a small census town in Seoni district in the state of Madhya Pradesh. It serves the headquarters for Janpad panchayat Ghansor. It hosts a railway station which is in the South Eastern Central Railways zone connecting Jabalpur and Balaghat. It has a government community health centre and has a robust government education centre with a network of schools and colleges both private and public. It is well connected with bus services from Lakhnadon, Seoni, Jabalpur and Mandla. Examples of recorded temperature conditions are; the lowest temperature has been -4°C on a winter night at 3:00 am in 2018, and the highest temperature has been 52°C at 3.00 pm in summer, 2016.

Geography 
It has an average elevation of 582 metres (1,909 feet).
The town is situated in heart of India. Ghansaur is a Tehsil / Block (CD) in the Seoni District of Madhya Pradesh. According to Census 2011 information the sub-district code of Ghansaur block is 03661. Total area of Ghansaur is 1,096 km² including 1,091.31 km² rural area and 5.16 km² urban area. Ghansaur has a population of 1,42,662 peoples. There are 33,092 houses in the sub-district. There are about 216 villages in Ghansaur block.

Demographics 
 India census, Ghansor had a population of 6,130. Males constitute 53% of the population and females 47%.  Ghansor has an average literacy rate of 70%, higher than the national average of 59.5%: male literacy is 76%, and female literacy is 64%. In Ghansor, 15% of the population is under 6 years of age. Religious communities found here include Jains Hindus Muslims Christians. Equal respect and toleration among communities are found here. Further the majority of the population are tribes which follow gondi culture having rich custom and traditions.

References 

Cities and towns in Seoni district
Seoni, Madhya Pradesh